La Espigadilla is a corregimiento in Los Santos District, Los Santos Province, Panama with a population of 1,675 as of 2010. Its population as of 1990 was 1,423; its population as of 2000 was 1,580.

References

Corregimientos of Los Santos Province